Anna Koutsoyiannis (1932–1986) was a Greek-born British microeconomist.

She was awarded a PhD by and took her first teaching job at the University of Manchester in the early 1960s. She then returned to the UK to work at the University of Lancaster (1968–1974). She then emigrated to Canada working first as Professor at the University of Waterloo and then at the University of Ottawa.

In 1978, the University of Waterloo gave her its 'Distinguished Teacher Award'. During 1968-73 Dr. Koutsoyiannis was Senior Lecturer and subsequently (1974–75) Reader in economics at the University of Lancaster. From 1962 to 1968 the author taught in Greece at the University of Thessaloniki, and the Graduate School of Business Studies, Athens, and was Senior Project Director at the Centre of Planning and Economic Research, Athens.
Koutsoyiannis died in 1986.

Further information on Koutsoyiannis is available in her entry in Mark Blaug's Who's Who in Economics.

Key books 
 The Leaf Tobacco Market of Greece. 1963.
 Demand Functions for Tobacco. 1963.

Noted textbooks 
 Theory of Econometrics. Macmillan, 1973. 
 Modern Microeconomics. Macmillan, 1975.
 Non-Price Decisions. Macmillan, 1982.

References

Sources 
Dimand, R. W., Dimand, M. A., & Forget, E. L. (2000). A biographical dictionary of women economists. Cheltenham, UK: Edward Elgar.

1932 births
1986 deaths
Greek women economists
20th-century Greek  economists
Academics of Lancaster University
Academic staff of the University of Waterloo
Academic staff of the University of Ottawa